Magdalena Maleeva and Patty Schnyder were the defending champions, but Maleeva did not compete this year, as she was competing in Doha at the same week. Schnyder teamed up with Maja Matevžič and lost in semifinals to Nathalie Dechy and Émilie Loit.

Kim Clijsters and Ai Sugiyama won the title by defeating Nathalie Dechy and Émilie Loit 6–2, 6–0 in the final.

Seeds

Draw

Draw

References
 Main and Qualifying Draws

2003 Doubles
Proximus Diamond Games